Belharat Rural District is a rural district (dehestan) in Miyan Jolgeh District, Nishapur County, Razavi Khorasan province, Iran. At the 2006 census, its population was 11,677, in 3,037 families.  The rural district has 21 villages.

References 

Rural Districts of Razavi Khorasan Province
Nishapur County